Penrith and Cockermouth was a parliamentary constituency centred on the towns of Penrith and Cockermouth in Cumberland, England.  It was alternatively known as Mid Cumberland.  It returned one Member of Parliament (MP) to the House of Commons of the Parliament of the United Kingdom, elected by the first past the post system.

History

The constituency was created for the 1918 general election, and abolished for the 1950 general election.

Boundaries
The Urban Districts of Cockermouth, Keswick, and Penrith, the Rural Districts of Alston with Garrigill, and Penrith, and part of the Rural District of Cockermouth.

Members of Parliament

Elections

Elections in the 1910s 

Lowther stood as a Unionist candidate, and received the Coalition Coupon

Elections in the 1920s

Elections in the 1930s 

General Election 1939–40:

Another General Election was required to take place before the end of 1940. The political parties had been making preparations for an election to take place and by the Autumn of 1939, the following candidates had been selected; 
Conservative: Alan Dower
Liberal: William Jackson
Labour: Harold Smith

Elections in the 1940s

References

Craig, F. W. S. (1983). British parliamentary election results 1918-1949 (3 ed.). Chichester: Parliamentary Research Services. .

Politics of Cumbria
Parliamentary constituencies in North West England (historic)
Constituencies of the Parliament of the United Kingdom established in 1918
Constituencies of the Parliament of the United Kingdom disestablished in 1950
Penrith, Cumbria